The All-Pro Basketball League Teams are annual selections made of the best five offensive and defensive players in a given Pro Basketball League (PBL) season. The selection was first made in the 2017–18 season and awards were handed out during the first Belgian Basketball Awards show, held on 22 May 2018 in Lint, Antwerp.

Teams

References

Basketball League Belgium Division I awards